Changhua Coastal Industrial Park (simply 彰濱工業區, Changbin) is located on reclaimed land in the coast of Changhua County of Taiwan, spanning Lukang Township, Xianxi Township and Shengang Township. 

It is an industrial cluster in Taiwan, with many different industries such as food production, spinning, chemical industries and metal processors.

External links
 
Industry developing tourism on the side, new business opportunities surfacing at Changbin Industrial Park

Industrial parks in Taiwan
Buildings and structures in Changhua County